Mount Soche is a mountain near Blantyre, Malawi.

Soche Forest Reserve was established in 1922, and covers 388 hectares.

References

Forest reserves of Malawi
Mountains of Malawi